Somerset County is a county located in the north-central part of the U.S. state of New Jersey. As of the 2020 census, the county was the state's 13th-most-populous county, with a population of 345,361, its highest decennial count ever and an increase of 21,917 (+6.8%) from the 2010 census count of 323,444. Somerset County constitutes part of the New York metropolitan area. Its county seat is Somerville.

In 2015, Somerset County had a per capita personal income of $86,468, the second highest in New Jersey and ranked 25th of 3,113 counties in the United States. Somerset County, as of the 2000 Census, was the seventh wealthiest county in the United States  by median household income at $76,933 (third in New Jersey behind Hunterdon County at $79,888 and Morris County at $77,340), fourth in median family income at $90,655 (second in New Jersey behind Hunterdon County at $91,050) and ranked seventh by per capita income at $37,970 (highest in New Jersey). The Bureau of Economic Analysis ranked the county as having the 11th-highest per capita income of all 3,113 counties in the United States (and the highest in New Jersey) as of 2009.

In 2012, 49.8 percent of Somerset County residents were college graduates, the highest percentage in the state. Somerset County was recently ranked number 3 of 21 NJ counties as one of the healthiest counties in New Jersey, according to an annual report by County Health Rankings and Roadmaps. Somerset County was created on May 14, 1688, from portions of Middlesex County. The county is located in the Central Jersey region and encompasses much of the Raritan Valley.

History

Etymology
Somerset County is one of America's oldest counties, and is named after the English county of Somerset.

History
The area was first settled in 1681, in the vicinity of Bound Brook, and the county was established by charter on May 22, 1688.  Most of the early residents were Dutch. General George Washington and his troops marched through the county on several occasions and slept in many of the homes located throughout the area.  Somerset County also played an important part during both World War I and World War II with weapons depots and the manufacturing of the army's woolen blankets. For much of its history, Somerset County was primarily an agricultural county.  In the late 19th century, the Somerset Hills area of Somerset County became a popular country home for wealthy industrialists. Into the 21st century, the area is still the home of wealthy businessmen.

In 1917, Somerset County, in cooperation with Rutgers University, hired its first agricultural agent to connect local farmers with expert advice. The Rutgers Cooperative Extension of Somerset County, located in Bridgewater, serves residents in the areas of agriculture and natural resources, 4-H youth development and family and community health sciences.

In the 1960s, townships that were once exclusively agricultural were quickly transformed into suburban communities. Examples include Bridgewater Township and the Watchung Hills communities of Watchung, Green Brook and Warren Township.  This growth was aided by the development of the county's very strong pharmaceutical and technology presence. Warren Township used to be considered "the greenest place in New Jersey." More recently, there has been an influx of New York City commuters who use NJ Transit's Raritan Valley Line and Gladstone Branch or use Interstate 78.

In 1996, Nicholas L. Bissell Jr., then county prosecutor, was charged with embezzlement, tax fraud, and abuse of power. He fled to Laughlin, Nevada, near Las Vegas, and killed himself when the federal authorities attempted to arrest him.

Geography

The lowest point is just above sea level on the Raritan River at the Middlesex County line.

Climate and weather
The county has a humid continental climate which is hot-summer (Dfa) except on Mine Mountain west of Bernardsville where it is warm-summer (Dfb).

Demographics

2020 census
As of the 2020 United States census, the county's had 345,361 people, 122,606 households, and 88,540 families. The racial makeup was 61.0% White, 10.0% African American, 0.2% Native American, 18.5% Asian, and 2.2% from two or more races. Hispanic or Latino of any race were 15.2% of the population.

Of the 122,606 households, of which 21.5% had children under the age of 18 living with them, 59.3% were married couples living together, 9.6% had a female householder with no husband present, 3.3% had a male householder with no wife present and 27.8% were non-families, and 9.3% had someone living alone who was 65 years of age or older. The average household size was 2.65 and the average family size was 3.16.

About 21.5% of the population was under age 18, 8.4% was from age 18 to 24, 36.3% was from age 15 to 44, and 16.2% was age 65 or older. The median age was 42.2 years. The gender makeup was 49.2% male and 50.8% female. For every 100 females, there were 96.8 males.

The median household income was $111,587, and the median family income was $135,129. About 5.7% of the population were below the poverty line, including 8.8% of those under age 18 and 6.1% of those age 65 or over.

2010 census

Parks and recreation

Somerset County parks are under the administration of the Somerset County Parks Commission. General parks are Natirar, Duke Island Park, Lord Stirling Park (part of the Great Swamp National Wildlife Refuge), Colonial Park, North Branch Park, Skillman Park, East County Park and a park in development called Raritan River Greenway. Leonard J. Buck Garden is a botanical garden of the county. In addition, the Commission manages natural parks such as the Washington Valley Park (with biking and hiking trails) and the Sourland Mountain Preserve (hiking and mountain biking trails).

The southeastern portion of Somerset County in Franklin Township also includes the Delaware and Raritan Canal State Park, which provides hiking, biking and boating.

The Parks Commission operates five public golf courses. Trump National Golf Club in Bedminster, an exclusive golf club owned by Donald Trump, that he used as a Summer White House during his presidency.

The Somerset Patriots are a professional baseball team that plays at the 6,100-seat TD Bank Ballpark, located on the border of Bridgewater and Bound Brook. They played in the independent Atlantic League of Professional Baseball until they became the Double-A affiliate of the New York Yankees in 2021.

Government

County Government 
Somerset County is governed by a five-member Board of County Commissioners, whose members are elected at-large to three-year terms of office on a staggered basis, with one or two seats coming up for election each year. At an annual reorganization meeting held on the first Friday of January, the board selects a Director and Deputy Director from among its members. In 2016, commissioners (then known as freeholders) were paid $21,902 and the commissioner director was paid an annual salary of $22,902. The Commissioners employ a full-time County Administrator who manages the day-to-day operations of the county government. The County Administrator is Colleen Mahr. The Clerk of the County Commissioners oversees the work of their offices. Department heads are appointed in accordance with statute and by resolution of the board. Somerset County currently has approximately 1,100 full-time and 130 part-time employees in 52 divisions (including the Library System).

, Somerset County's County Commissioners are (with terms for director and deputy director ending every December 31st):

Pursuant to Article VII Section II of the New Jersey State Constitution, each county in New Jersey is required to have three elected administrative officials known as "constitutional officers." These officers are the County Clerk and County Surrogate (both elected for five-year terms of office) and the County Sheriff (elected for a three-year term). Constitutional officers, elected on a countywide basis are:

The Somerset County Prosecutor is Michael H. Robertson of the Basking Ridge section of Bernards Township, who was nominated by the Governor of New Jersey Chris Christie in September 2016. Somerset County is a part of Vicinage 13 of the New Jersey Superior Court (along with Hunterdon County and Warren County), which is seated at the Somerset County Courthouse in Somerville; the Assignment Judge for Vicinage 15 is Thomas C. Miller.

Federal representatives 
The 7th and 12th Congressional Districts cover the county.

State representatives 
The 21 municipalities of Somerset County are represented by six legislative districts.

Politics 
As of October 1, 2021, there were a total of 262,410 registered voters in Somerset County, of whom 92,921 (35.4%) were registered as Democrats, 66,455 (25.3%) were registered as Republicans and 100,367 (38.2%) were registered as unaffiliated. There were 2,667 voters (1.0%) registered to other parties. Among the county's 2010 Census population, 67.1% were registered to vote, including 75.% of those ages 18 and over.

In the 2008, Barack Obama became the first Democratic presidential nominee to carry the county since Lyndon Johnson in 1964, and only the second since 1936.  Obama won Somerset by a 6.1% margin over John McCain, with Obama carrying the state by 15.5% over McCain. Somerset's growing Democratic trend at the presidential level has largely been spurred by the rapid growth of the overwhelmingly Democratic Franklin Township in the county's southeast corner. In the 2012 presidential election, the county was carried by Barack Obama, winning 52.8% of the vote to Mitt Romney's 47.2%, a 5.6% gap that represented a 0.5% drop off for Obama from his 2008 margin of victory in the county. In 2016, the county voted as Democratic as the state, and in 2020, Joe Biden won the largest share of the vote in the county for a Democrat since 1964, as the county voted more Democratic than the state as a whole for the first time since 1912. 

|}

In the 2009 gubernatorial election, Republican Chris Christie received 56% of the vote, defeating Democrat Jon Corzine, who received around 34%. In the 2013 gubernatorial election, Republican Governor Chris Christie received 67.6% (58,981 votes) to Democrat Barbara Buono's 30.8% (26,913 votes). In the 2017 gubernatorial election, Republican Kim Guadagno received 47.9% of the vote (44,231 ballots cast) to Democrat Phil Murphy with 49.8% (45,935 votes), marking the first Democratic win in the county since 1989. In the 2021 gubernatorial election, Republican Jack Ciattarelli received 47.7% of the vote (54,264 ballots cast) to Democrat Phil Murphy's 51.5% (58,585 votes), this made Somerset, along with neighboring Hunterdon, the only county to shift to the left in this election, despite Ciattarelli representing the county in the state Senate.

Education

School districts
School districts include:

K-12

Bernards Township School District
Bound Brook School District
Bridgewater-Raritan Regional School District
Franklin Township Public Schools
Hillsborough Township School District
Manville School District
Montgomery Township School District
North Plainfield School District
Somerset Hills Regional School District
Somerville Public Schools

Secondary
Somerset County Vocational and Technical School District
Watchung Hills Regional High School

Elementary

Bedminster Township School District
Branchburg Township School District
Green Brook School District
South Bound Brook School District
Warren Township Schools
Watchung Borough Schools

Colleges and universities
Somerset County is home to two colleges:

 Raritan Valley Community College (RVCC), North Branch section of Branchburg Township (public). Rutgers University has a partnership with Raritan Valley Community College which allows students who have an accredited associate degree to complete a bachelor's degree by attending Rutgers classes at RVCC's North Branch campus. The degree completion program is specifically designed to cater to the transfer student looking to complete their bachelor's degree while staying close to home.
 Somerset Christian College, now known as Pillar College, is located in the Zarephath section of Franklin Township (private).

Alma White College (which operated from 1921 to 1978) was a private college located in Zarephath. Beginning in 1931 the college operated WAWZ 1380 on the AM radio dial. The station continued to 1984 after the school closed. The building is now occupied by Somerset Christian College.

Somerset Hills Learning Institute, founded in 1998 and now located in Bedminster Township, is a state-of-the-art program dedicated to educating children on the autism spectrum by utilizing the principles of applied behavior analysis.

Economy

Taxation
Based on IRS data for the 2004 tax year, Somerset County taxpayers had the ninth-highest average federal income tax liability per return in the country.  Average tax liability was $16,502, representing 16.8% of adjusted gross income.

Municipalities 

The 21 municipalities in Somerset County (with 2010 Census data for population, housing units, and area) are listed below. Other unincorporated communities in the county are listed alongside their parent municipality (or municipalities, as the case may be). These areas include census-designated places (CDPs), which the United States Census Bureau created for enumeration purposes within a Township. Other communities, historical areas, unincorporated areas, and enclaves that exist within a municipality are also listed.

Transportation

Roads and highways
Somerset County is served by a number of different routes.

Major county roads that pass through include County Route 512, County Route 514, County Route 518, County Route 523, County Route 525, County Route 527, County Route 529, County Route 531 and County Route 533.

The only two state routes that traverse through the county are Route 27 (only in Franklin) and Route 28.

U.S. Routes include U.S. Route 22, U.S. Route 202 and U.S. Route 206.

The two Interstates that pass through Somerset County are Interstate 78 and Interstate 287.

Interstate 95 was planned to run along the Somerset Freeway from its proposed southern end in Hopewell Township, Mercer County to Franklin Township at I-287 in the 1960s. However, this plan was cancelled in 1983.

Route 18 runs at the New Brunswick border of Somerset.

Public transportation

NJ Transit provides train service on the Gladstone Branch and the Raritan Valley Line. Public bus transportation is provided by several transit agencies.

NJ Transit provides bus service to the Port Authority Bus Terminal in Midtown Manhattan, as well as service to major cities in New Jersey and within Somerset County. Ridewise provides three SCOOT shuttles as well as DASH buses and CAT buses.

See also

Colonel Routh Goshen
Duke Gardens
Hall-Mills Murder
Meadows Foundation (New Jersey)
National Register of Historic Places listings in Somerset County, New Jersey
Old Dutch Parsonage
Rockingham
Six-Mile Run Reservoir

References

External links

Somerset County website
Somerset County National Historic Places
Somerset County Parks Commission
The Historical Society of the Somerset Hills – Includes Bedminster, Bernardsville, Basking Ridge, Far Hills, Peapack/Gladstone
Hills List is a local informational website for the Bedminster and Basking Ridge areas
Rutgers at Raritan Valley Community College

 
1688 establishments in New Jersey
Central Jersey
Counties in the New York metropolitan area
Populated places established in 1688